

Introduction 
A menstruation celebration, or period party, celebrates menstruation. Different cultures and communities across the globe celebrate Menarche (first period). This practice is followed by Apache, Ojibwe and Hupa tribal communities from different parts of North America, Ulithi tribe from South Pacific region, Japan, Africa, and India among others.

India 
Different states/regions and communities in India celebrate menstruation.

Odisha 
The festival in Odisha is called  Raja Parba or Mithuna Sankranti. It is a four-day festival which celebrates the girl's transition into womanhood. The first-day is called Pahili Raja, second Mithuna Sankranti, third Basi Raja and the last day is called Vasumati Snana. It is believed that Goddess Earth also menstruates during the first three days of the festival. Prior to day of the celebration, called Sajabaja , entire house is cleaned and on the first three days of the festival the spices are ground on the grinding stone. While all the preparation is going on, women enjoy during the festival and wear new clothes, jewellery and put alta (a red/pink coloured liquid applied on feet and hands) on their feet. On the last day of the festival, women go to the grinding stone and bathe in turmeric. The festival is completed with the ritual bath of Goddess Bhudevi.

Assam 
In Assam, the menstruation celebration is called Toloni Biya/  Tuloni Biya/ Nua-tulon/Santi Biya. The word Biya in Assamese means marriage, thus, Toloni Biya is a  ceremonial symbolic wedding of the girl after her first periods. This ceremony (symbolic wedding) is celebrated with great enthusiasm, and the purpose of this celebration is to educate the girl about reproduction and menstrual cycle. The parents of the girl and neighbours pray for the well-being of her reproductive health. 

In addition to the celebration, the ceremony also secludes the girl and imposes restrictions on her movements and food preferences, such as; being brought home in a with a veil (face covering), no food other than bananas, confined to a room, no contact with men including family members.

Apache Sunrise Dance Ceremony 
The Sunrise Dance ceremony is a celebration of menarche by the Apache tribal community in Arizona and Mexico region. The community members and leaders assist the family in carrying out this ceremony. The community starts preparing for this ceremony months before. A day prior to the ceremony, the girl takes a sweat bath, meanwhile the male relatives and a medicine man (a healer) make the items that will be required during the ceremony. In the evening, these items are presented to the girl. 

The ceremony takes place over a period of four-days and in eight stages. During this ceremony, the girl wears the traditional Apache attire and dances, which signifies female strength. The friends and family also participate and sing traditional songs and the girl also receives a massage and the ceremonial blessing from the medicine man and other people.

See also
 Culture and menstruation

References

Menstrual cycle